The Tenth Doctor Adventures, announced in October 2015, is a Big Finish Productions audio play series based on the television series Doctor Who. It sees the return of David Tennant as the Tenth Doctor and Catherine Tate as Donna Noble. The first trilogy of stories was released in May 2016. In November 2017 a second volume was released, featuring the Tenth Doctor and Rose Tyler. A third volume was released in May 2019, with Tate again reprising her role as Donna.

Cast

Notable Guests

Doctor Who characters

 Camille Coduri as Jackie Tyler 
 Jacqueline King as Sylvia Noble 

 Bernard Cribbins as Wilfred Mott 
 Terry Molloy as Davros

Other

 Chris Jarman as The Pastor & Vesht 
Gemma Whelan as The Nun 
 Blake Ritson as Rudolph  & Major McLinn 
 Nina Toussaint-White as Mariah Six 

 Mark Gatiss as George Sheldrake  & Joseph Delon 
 Noma Dumezweni as Rodekka 
 Joseph Millson as Colonel Keelan

Episodes

Volumes

Volume 1 (2016)

Volume 2 (2017)

Volume 3 (2019)

Out of Time (2020–2022)

Dalek Universe (2021)

Prologue (2021)

Episodes (2021)

The Tenth Doctor and River Song (2020)

Tenth Doctor, Classic Companions (2022)

Awards and nominations

References

Audio plays based on Doctor Who
Big Finish Productions
Doctor Who spin-offs
Tenth Doctor audio plays